Clynelish distillery is a distillery near Brora, Sutherland in the Highlands of Scotland.

The original Clynelish distillery was built in 1819, adjacent to the present operational Clynelish distillery, which was built in 1967.
When Clynelish first started distilling, in the years 1820-1822, they were producing around 12,000 gallons (around 54,000 litres) per year. Over the years the distillery passed from owner to owner, until the distillery expanded around 1896, and was upped to around 580,000 litres. This was when they added an extra warehouses on site.

However, in the 1960s, more and more of Clynelish's spirit was going into the blends, and in the 1960s there was a boom and people were buying more luxury items such as cars and whisky. So they needed to up their production levels. So in 1967 they built the current distillery in which they produce today. The two  distilleries ran side-by-side as Clynelish A and Clynelish B for a while, as they wanted to make sure they had perfected the taste in the new space. Then they closed the older distillery the following year.

However, in the following years, Caol Ila distillery faced a drought and closed for a year and did refurbishments. Johnnie Walker was missing the peated whisky in their blends and needed something to go in its place. So Clynelish reopened the original distillery in May 1969, under the name Brora Distillery, and started making Brora whisky. Brora's PPM levels (Phenol Parts per Million) –  which is what is used to talk about the level of peat used in the whisky - started at around 30-35 PPM, which is on level with Caol Ila (30-35 PPM) and Lagavulin (35-40 PPM).

Brora went into the blends for one year whilst Caol Ila was closed and then continued to make the whisky as a single malt and ran until July 1983. Following closure in 1983, Brora whisky has become one of the most rare and desired whiskies in the world, costing around one and a half thousand pounds a bottle. Brora's latest, and last release of the original spirit is in their bi-centenary bottling, to celebrate the 200 years of the distillery being in production. This bottling is a 40 year old Brora selected to celebrate this, making 1819 bottles to represent the first year the distillery first started producing.

Clynelish has had a strong connection with Johnnie Walker blended whisky for many years. Around 95% of the spirit is used in Johnnie Walker, Most commonly found in the Gold Label Reserve.

References

 Jackson, Michael, (2004). The Malt Whisky Companion, Penguin Books 2004  
 Malt Madness - all about Scotch whisky 
 Dr Patrick Brossard : BRORA ; A Legendary Distillery (1819-1983) and Whisky

Distilleries in Scotland
Scottish malt whisky
Sutherland
1872 establishments in Scotland
Brora